Pedro Vilca Apaza District is one of five districts of the province San Antonio de Putina in Peru.

History 
Pedro Vilca Apaza District was created on March 17, 1962.

Geography 
Other mountains are listed below:

Ethnic groups 
The people in the district are mainly indigenous citizens of Quechua descent. Quechua is the language which the majority of the population (89.53%) learnt to speak in childhood, 4.32% of the residents started speaking using the Spanish language (2007 Peru Census).

Mayors 
 2011–2014: Cecilio Maldonado Cañapataña. 
 2007–2010: Juan Pablo Salas Chipana.

See also 
 Administrative divisions of Peru
 Pedro Vilca Apaza

References

External links 
 INEI Peru